Kader Camara (born 18 March 1982) is a Guinean football player who currently plays for Etzella Ettelbruck in the Luxembourg National Division.

Career
In 2003, Camara was part of Cercle Brugge, the team that became Belgian Second Division champions, thus achieving promotion to the highest level of Belgian football. Among Camara's for teams are Vitesse (as youth player), RC Harelbeke, Dessel Sport and Beringen-Heusden-Zolder. Also, he played five seasons for Azerbaijan Premier League side Gabala from July 2007.

Camara returned to Gabala following, six months with Olimpik-Shuvalan, in February 2010.

International career
He was part of the Guinean 2004 African Nations Cup team, who finished second in their group in the first round of competition, before losing in the quarter finals to Mali. He played 12 minutes of the 1-1 group game against Rwanda, coming on as a substitute for Abdoul Salam Sow.

Career statistics

References

 Cerclemuseum.be 
 Kader Camara player info at the official Cercle Brugge website 

1982 births
Living people
Guinean footballers
Guinean expatriate footballers
Cercle Brugge K.S.V. players
SBV Vitesse players
Expatriate footballers in Belgium
Expatriate footballers in the Netherlands
K.F.C. Dessel Sport players
Expatriate footballers in Azerbaijan
Athlético de Coléah players
Belgian Pro League players
Challenger Pro League players
Gabala FC players
C.S. Visé players
K.R.C. Zuid-West-Vlaanderen players
Association football midfielders
Guinea international footballers